Peoples Hollow is a valley in Wayne County in the U.S. state of Missouri.

Peoples Hollow has the name of Walker Peoples, a pioneer citizen.

References

Valleys of Wayne County, Missouri
Valleys of Missouri